MFK Skalica is a Slovak football team, based in the town of Skalica. The club was founded in 1920. The club plays in the Fortuna Liga, first football league in the Slovakia, and hosts home games at the Mestský štadión Skalica.

History
 1920–1945 Founded as ŠK Skalica
 1945–1953 Renamed Sokol Tekla Skalica
 1953–1963 Renamed DŠO Tatran Skalica
 1963–1990 Renamed TJ ZVL Skalica
 1990–2006 Renamed Športový klub ŠK Skalica
 2006–present Renamed MFK Skalica

Promotion to Fortuna Liga
MFK Skalica reached Fortuna Liga despite defeat 0:2 by MFK Zemplín Michalovce in closing match of DOXXbet liga on 13 June 2015 and they surprised everyone by securing the second spot in the league and securing the first historical promotion to the highest football tier in Slovakia as well as MFK Zemplín Michalovce.

Honours

Domestic
 Slovak Second Division
  Runners-up (2): 2014–15 (Promoted), 2017–18
 Slovak Cup (1961–present)
  Runners-Up (1): 2016–17

Sponsorship

Current squad 
As of 8 February 2023

For recent transfers, see List of Slovak football transfers winter 2022-23.

Management Staff 

Source: mfkskalica.sk

Notable players 
Had international caps for their respective countries. Players whose name is listed in bold represented their countries while playing for Skalica.

  Martin Dobrotka
  Ľuboš Hajdúch
  Ikenna Hilary
  Pavol Majerník
  Jaroslav Mihalík
  Juraj Piroska
  Blažej Vaščák

Managers

  Štefan Horný (2012–30 June 2015)
  Aleš Křeček (3 July 2015 – 28 Oct 2015)
  Štefan Horný (28 Oct 2015 – 31 May 2016)
  Jozef Kostelník (May 2016–July 2018)
  Jozef Dojčan (July 2018-July 2019)
  Jozef Kostelník (July 2019-May 2022)
  Juraj Jarábek (May 2022 – Dec 2022)
  Pavol Majerník (Dec 2022 – )

References

External links 
 Official website 

Football clubs in Slovakia
Association football clubs established in 1920
MFK Skalica